Smoking concerts were live performances, usually of music, before an audience of men only, popular during the Victorian era.  These social occasions were instrumental in introducing new musical forms to the public.  At these functions men would smoke and speak of politics while listening to live music.  These popular gatherings were sometimes held at hotels. The crews of HMS Curlew and HMS Hawkins attended a Smoker aboard USS Huron in Wei-hai-wei harbour, China, on 19 August 1921.

Although the concerts are now obsolete, the term continued and is used for student-organised variety performances, especially at Oxford and Cambridge. Annual Smoking Concerts were held at Imperial College London into the 1980s and continue at Glasgow University Union.

The saying "Booking for smoking concerts now" came into use at this time meaning that a person had recovered and was in the prime of health.  This saying is used in the works of writer P.G. Wodehouse.

The Liverpool Medical Students Society at the University of Liverpool School of Medicine still hold an annual smoking concert, a tradition going back 130 years. Each of the five year groups present a play annually.

References
Eva Mantzourani (Canterbury Christ Church University College), ‘The Aroma of the Music and the Fragrance of the Weed’: Music and Smoking in Victorian London.

External links 
  Picture of a Victorian hotel with a smoking concerts advertisement.

Performances
Smoking